Gallinuloides is a prehistoric genus of primitive galliform bird. It lived about 48 million years ago in North America. The type specimen was found in a Green River Formation deposit in Wyoming.

 

The former Gallinuloides prentici was eventually placed (after a brief stint in Grus) in a distinct genus Paragrus; it is no galliform but belongs to the Geranoididae (Lambrecht 1933:520).

References

 Lambrecht, Kálmán (1933): Handbuch der Palaeornithologie. Gebrüder Bornträger, Berlin.

Eocene birds
Bird genera
Paleogene birds of North America
Fossil taxa described in 1900